"Hot Girls in Love" is a song recorded by the rock band Loverboy. It appeared on the band's third album Keep it Up, in 1983. The song peaked in June 1983 at #11 on the Billboard Hot 100 chart and at #2 on the Mainstream Rock chart.

Cash Box reviewed the single stating that this "hard guitar driven rocker suitably keeps the temp 'a hundred above.'"

Covers
"Hot Girls in Love" was covered by the European glam rock band, The Cherry Bombz, and was the title track to their 1985 mini-LP.

In the 1980s, the instrumental from Loverboy's version was used as the theme song to the National Wrestling Alliance television program Championship Wrestling from Georgia on WTBS.

Charts

References

Loverboy songs
1983 singles
Song recordings produced by Bruce Fairbairn
Music videos directed by Steve Barron
Songs written by Paul Dean (guitarist)
1983 songs
Columbia Records singles